Bandwidth management is the process of measuring and controlling the communications (traffic, packets) on a network link, to avoid filling the link to capacity or overfilling the link, which would result in network congestion and poor performance of the network. Bandwidth is described by bit rate and measured in units of bits per second (bit/s) or bytes per second (B/s).

Bandwidth management mechanisms and techniques 
Bandwidth management mechanisms may be used to further engineer performance and includes:

 Traffic shaping (rate limiting):
Token bucket
Leaky bucket
 TCP rate control - artificially adjusting TCP window size as well as controlling the rate of ACKs being returned to the sender
 Scheduling algorithms:
 Weighted fair queuing (WFQ)
 Class based weighted fair queuing
 Weighted round robin (WRR)
 Deficit weighted round robin (DWRR)
 Hierarchical Fair Service Curve (HFSC)
 Congestion avoidance:
RED, WRED - Lessens the possibility of port queue buffer tail-drops and this lowers the likelihood of TCP global synchronization
 Policing (marking/dropping the packet in excess of the committed traffic rate and burst size)
 Explicit congestion notification
 Buffer tuning -  allows you to modify the way a router allocates buffers from its available memory, and helps prevent packet drops during a temporary burst of traffic.
 Bandwidth reservation protocols / algorithms
 Constraint-based Routing Label Distribution Protocol (CR-LDP)
 Top-nodes algorithm
 Traffic classification - categorising traffic according to some policy in order that the above techniques can be applied to each class of traffic differently

Link performance 
Issues which may limit the performance of a given link include:

 TCP determines the capacity of a connection by flooding it until packets start being dropped (slow start)
 Queueing in routers results in higher latency and jitter as the network approaches (and occasionally exceeds) capacity
 TCP global synchronization when the network reaches capacity results in waste of bandwidth
 Burstiness of web traffic requires spare bandwidth to rapidly accommodate the bursty traffic
 Lack of widespread support for explicit congestion notification and quality of service management on the Internet
 Internet Service Providers typically retain control over queue management and quality of service at their end of the link
 Window Shaping allows higher end products to reduce traffic flows, which reduce queue depth and allow more users to share more bandwidth fairly

Tools and techniques 
 Packet sniffer is a program or a device that eavesdrops on the network traffic by grabbing information traveling over a network
 Network traffic measurement

See also 
 Bandwidth cap
 Bandwidth management is a subset of network management and performance management
 Bandwidth management using NetFlow and IPFIX data
 Bandwidth throttling
 Customer service unit a device to balance the data rate on user's telecommunication equipment
 INASP runs bandwidth management training workshops and produces reports
 Network congestion avoidance lists some techniques for prevention and management of congestion on routers
 Network traffic measurement is a subset of network monitoring
 Traffic shaping and rate limiting are bandwidth management (traffic control) techniques

References

 
 "Deploying IP and MPLS QoS for Multiservice Networks: Theory and Practice" by John Evans, Clarence Filsfils (Morgan Kaufmann, 2007)

External links
Bandwidth Management Tools, Strategies, and Issues
TechSoup for Libraries: Bandwidth Management
The True Price of Bandwidth Monitoring
 Sniffers Basics and Detection

Network performance

de:Netzwerk-Scheduler